Green Patch is a settlement on East Falkland, in the Falkland Islands, It is on the north east coast, on the south shore of Berkeley Sound, a few miles south east from Port Louis, on Port Louis Harbour. It looks out onto Long Island and Hog Island.

It was the location of an experiment to try to remedy the land ownership imbalance in the islands:
This was acquired by the Falkland Islands Government, subdivided into six separate holdings and in 1980 was leased to applicants, with an option to apply for freehold possession after twenty years.

References

Populated places on East Falkland
History of the Falkland Islands